A Ghetto Christmas Carol is a Christmas-themed extended play by American rapper and singer XXXTentacion. It was released on December 11, 2017, by Bad Vibes Forever. The production was handled primarily by fellow American record producer, Ronny J and XXXTentacion himself, alongside Cubeatz and J Dilla.

Track listing
The EP includes a protest song by XXXTentacion against then-President Donald Trump, "Hate Will Never Win".

Credits adapted from Tidal.

Personnel
Credits adapted from Tidal.
 XXXTentacion – vocals, composition, engineering, executive production, production
 Ronny J – composition, executive production, production
 Cubeatz – composition
 J Dilla – production
 Robbie Soukiasyan – engineering
 Koen Heldens – mixing
 Kevin Peterson – assistant mastering
 Dave Kutch – mastering

Charts

References

2017 EPs
XXXTentacion albums
Albums produced by J Dilla
Albums produced by Ronny J
Albums produced by Cubeatz

Alternative rock albums by American artists
Alternative rock EPs
Political hip hop albums
Emo EPs
Hip hop EPs